Cristina Fraguas (born 8 July 1976) is a Spanish gymnast. She competed in six events at the 1992 Summer Olympics.

References

1976 births
Living people
Spanish female artistic gymnasts
Olympic gymnasts of Spain
Gymnasts at the 1992 Summer Olympics
Gymnasts from Madrid